Jüri Tuulik (22 February 1940 Abruka island, Saare County – 3 June 2014 Kuressaare) was an Estonian writer and playwright.

In 1963 he graduated from Tartu State University in Estonian philology. After graduating he worked at the newspapers Edasi, Noorte Hääl and the journal Vesikaar. Since 1969 he was a professional writer.

His twin brother was the writer Ülo Tuulik and his cousin was writer Juhan Smuul. Since 1972 he was a member of Estonian Writers' Union.

Awards
1977: Eduard Vilde Literature Prize 
1979: Juhan Smuul Literature Annual Award 
1981: Juhan Smuul Annual Literature Prize 
1986: Meritorious Writer of the Estonian SSR
1998: August Mälk Short Story Award 
1999: August Mälk Short Story Award 
2000: August Mälk short story award 
2005: Oskar Luts Humor Award
2005: Hendrik Krumm Cultural Scholarship
2009: Friedebert Tuglas Short Story Award

Works

 1966: short prose "Tund enne väljasõitu: jutte ja laaste 1962-1964". Tallinn: Eesti Raamat, 104 pp.
 1972: short prose "Vana loss: Abruka lood". Tallinn: Eesti Raamat, 192 pp.
 1979: novel "Vares". Tallinn: Perioodika (Loomingu Raamatukogu)

References

1940 births
2014 deaths
Estonian dramatists and playwrights
Estonian male short story writers
Estonian male novelists
Estonian editors
20th-century Estonian poets
21st-century Estonian poets
Estonian twins
University of Tartu alumni
People from Saaremaa Parish